Anja Hammerseng-Edin (born 5 February 1983) is a former Norwegian handball player. She previously played for Larvik HK and for the Norwegian national team.

Career
Hammerseng-Edin made her début on the Norwegian national team in 2006, and played 59 matches and scored 143 goals between 2006 and 2013. She represented Norway when the team won a bronze medal at the 2009 World Women's Handball Championship in China, as well as winning a silver medal at the 2012 European Women's Handball Championship in Serbia. She was also part of the National team at the 2013 World Women's Handball Championship.

She retired from her handball career in 2017, and currently works as a conference speaker.

Individual awards
MVP of the European Championship: 2012

Personal life
Edin started playing handball when she was 5 years old, with her mother as a trainer.

She is married to fellow handball player Gro Hammerseng, and they have a son together, born on 2 February 2012. Hammerseng and Edin married on 3 August 2013. The couple both play for the Norwegian handball club Larvik HK.

Hammerseng-Edin and her wife wrote a book together titled Anja + Gro = Mio, which was published in February 2014.

References

External links

1983 births
Living people
Norwegian female handball players
Norwegian LGBT sportspeople
LGBT handball players
Lesbian sportswomen
21st-century LGBT people
Sportspeople from Porsgrunn